Path of the Weakening is the third studio release by the American death metal band Deeds of Flesh. It was released in 1999.

Track listing

Personnel

Musicians
Jacoby Kingston – bass, vocals
Erik Lindmark – guitar, vocals
Jimmy Tkacz – guitar
Joey Heaslet – drums

Production
Recorded at Moon Productions Recording Studio
Produced by Deeds of Flesh
Thomas E. Gingell – Engineer

External links
 

1999 albums
Deeds of Flesh albums
Unique Leader Records albums